Marody is a panchayat village in Dakshina Kannada district in the foothills of the Western Ghats. There are two villages in the Naravi gram panchayat: Marody and Perady. It is 25 km from Karkala towards Dharmasthala.

Villages in Dakshina Kannada district